Beğendik is a municipality in the Pervari District of Siirt Province in Turkey. The village is populated by Kurds of the Adiyan and Şakiran tribes. It had a population of 2,123 in 2021.

References 

Populated places in Siirt Province
Kurdish settlements in Siirt Province